Honda Malaysia Racing Team is an auto racing team from Malaysia establish in 2003 by Honda Malaysia to compete in Merdeka Millennium Endurance race, currently competing in the Sepang 1000 km. Interesting enough, the team members are mostly Honda Malaysia's staffs to encourage them to practise the Honda's Challenging Spirit philosophy. They had no experience in racing and were trained from a zero to a hero. 

Between year 2003 to 2007, the team received technical guidance from Mugen Motorsports and since 2008 the team became an independent Malaysian team with advisers from Japan.

The team has won Merdeka Millennium Endurance Class A five times in a row from 2003 to 2007, it also won the race overall in 2004.

Merdeka Millennium Endurance Result

Sepang 1000 km Result

References

Honda
Malaysian auto racing teams
2003 establishments in Malaysia
Auto racing teams established in 2003
Honda in motorsport